Card Football Premiere Edition is a poker-like strategy game developed in 2004 by brothers Paolo and Fabio Del Rio, former editors of Canadian Sports Collector. It employs what its developers call the D54 Game System, a patented modification of the 54-card deck. The game was designed by CSE Games, published by SportFX International and was named one of the Top 10 Best Card Games of 2006 by About.com.

An updated version of Card Football was slated to release in early 2009. Titled NCAA Football Hand-Off, the new licensed version of the game would include 20 top U.S. college teams.

References

External links
 Card Football Premiere Edition on CSE Games' website
 

Board games introduced in 2006
Sports board games